Central Wheatbelt is an electoral district of the Legislative Assembly in the Australian state of Western Australia.

The district is centrally located in the Wheatbelt region of Western Australia.

Politically, Central Wheatbelt is a safe National Party seat.

History
Central Wheatbelt was first created for the 2008 state election. It was essentially an amalgamation of the abolished National-held districts of Avon and Merredin, although parts of each ended up in neighbouring districts. Roughly half the new district's voters came from each of the two former districts.

The original proposal had the newly created district persisting with the name Merredin. However, this was the focus of several objections, as Merredin is but one town in the eastern part of this sizeable electorate. Instead, the more generic name of Central Wheatbelt was adopted.

Geography
Central Wheatbelt incorporates a number of rural inland shires to the east of Perth. Its population centres include Ballidu, Beacon, Beverley, Dowerin, Koorda, Meckering, Merredin, Narembeen, Northam, Pingelly, Southern Cross, Tammin, Westonia, Wongan Hills, Wundowie, Wyalkatchem and York.

Members for Central Wheatbelt

Election results

References

External links
 
 

Electoral districts of Western Australia
Wheatbelt (Western Australia)
2008 establishments in Australia
Constituencies established in 2008